Ribta is a town in the northern Obock region of Djibouti. The area was marred by conflict in the 1990s. A "Bonfire for Peace" was held in Ribta to destroy weapons used in conflict in the region. Geologically a tectonic movement in the past has been referred to as the Ribta Formation.

References

External links
Ribta at Geographic.org

Populated places in Djibouti